"White, Discussion" is a song by the rock group Live, which was released as the fifth and final single from their 1994 album, Throwing Copper.

The song was released as a single in the United States and reached No. 71 on the Billboard Hot 100 Airplay chart, No. 15 on the Modern Rock Tracks chart and No. 12 on the Mainstream Rock Tracks chart. In Canada, "White, Discussion" reached #12 on the RPM Alternative chart.

The acoustic versions of the songs, released as B-sides, were originally broadcast on the Global Satellite Network's "Modern Rock Live" program.
A remix of the song was included on the Virtuosity film soundtrack.

Track listings
All songs written by Live:

Italian single
"White, Discussion" (Album Version) – 6:08
"Lightning Crashes" (Live) – 6:03
"I Alone" (Live) – 4:17
"Pain Lies on the Riverside" – 5:11
"Operation Spirit (The Tyranny of Tradition)" (Live) – 3:47
"The Beauty of Gray" (Live) – 4:30

Australian single
"White, Discussion" – 4:41
"I Alone" (Acoustic) – 3:48

Netherlands single
"White, Discussion" (Sam Sever Remix) – 4:23
"White, Discussion" (Live at Glastonbury) – 5:34
"White, Discussion" (Album Version) – 6:08

Charts

References

External links
 Official website

Live (band) songs
1994 singles
Songs written by Ed Kowalczyk
Song recordings produced by Jerry Harrison
1994 songs
Radioactive Records singles